North Fork is an unincorporated community in Elko County, Nevada, United States. The ZIP Code of North Fork, Nevada is 89801.

History
A post office was established at North Fork in 1889, and remained in operation until 1944.  A variant name is "Northfork". The community takes its name from nearby North Fork Humboldt River. Due to its small size, some writers classify North Fork as a ghost town.

References

Unincorporated communities in Elko County, Nevada
Unincorporated communities in Nevada
Elko, Nevada micropolitan area